Your Love may refer to:

Albums 
 Your Love (Marié Digby album) or the title song, 2011
 Your Love (Raymond Lam album), 2008
 Your Love (Wang Leehom album) or the title song, 2015
 Your Love, by Glen Washington, 2002
 Your Love, by Lime, or the title song (see below), 1981

Songs 
 Your Love (Once Upon A Time In The West) (Ennio Morricone), 2003
 "Your Love" (Brandon Heath song), 2010
 "Your Love" (David Guetta and Showtek song), 2018
 "Your Love" (Diddy – Dirty Money song), 2010
 "Your Love" (Graham Central Station song), 1975
 "Your Love" (Jamie Principle song), 1986
 "Your Love" (Jim Brickman song), 1997
 "Your Love" (Lime song), 1981
 "Your Love" (Marilyn McCoo and Billy Davis Jr. song), 1977
 "Your Love" (Nicole Scherzinger song), 2014
 "Your Love" (Nicki Minaj song), 2010
 "Your Love" (The Outfield song), 1986
 "Your Love" (Tammy Wynette song), 1987
 "Your Love (Means Everything to Me)", by Charles Wright & the Watts 103rd Street Rhythm Band, 1971
 "Your Luv", by MBLAQ, 2011
 "Your Love", by Alamid, 1994
 "Your Love", by Azana, 2020
 "Your Love", by Boris Way, 2017
 "Your Love", by Culture Beat, 2008
 "Your Love", by Diana Ross from Forever Diana: Musical Memoirs, 1993
 "Your Love", by Keane from Night Train, 2010
 "Your Love", by Kylie Minogue from Fever, 2001
 "Your Love", by Little Mix from Glory Days, 2016
 "Your Love", by Michael Bolton from Michael Bolotin, 1975
 "Your Love", by the Prodigy, a B-side of the single "Charly", 1991
 "Your Love (9PM)", by ATB, Topic, and A7S, a remix of "9 PM (Till I Come)", 2021
 "Your Love (Déjà Vu)", by Glass Animals from Dreamland, 2020

See also